Miguel Ángel Echenausi (born 21 February 1968) is a Venezuelan football defender who made a total number of 28 appearances for the Venezuela national team between 1991 and 2000.

Club career
He started his professional career at Naciónal Táchira.

References

External links

1968 births
Living people
Venezuelan footballers
Venezuela international footballers
Association football defenders
Estudiantes de Mérida players
Cúcuta Deportivo footballers
Everton de Viña del Mar footballers
Universidad de Concepción footballers
Caracas FC players
Deportivo Táchira F.C. players
Primera B de Chile players
Categoría Primera A players
1991 Copa América players
1993 Copa América players
1999 Copa América players
Venezuelan expatriate footballers
Expatriate footballers in Chile
Expatriate footballers in Colombia
Venezuelan expatriate sportspeople in Chile
Venezuelan expatriate sportspeople in Colombia
Yaracuyanos F.C. managers